Ijon Tichy: Space Pilot (German: Ijon Tichy: Raumpilot) is a satiric German television series loosely based on the series of science fiction stories The Star Diaries by Stanisław Lem. The television series was created by Randa Chahoud, Dennis Jacobsen, and Oliver Jahn with Jahn playing the protagonist, space traveller Ijon Tichy. The major female role, the female robot hologramme, is played by Nora Tschirner.

The first season was aired from 26 March 2007 on ZDF on Mondays at 23:55 hours. One week before the airing, each episode used to be published online as a streaming video  on ZDF mediathek, an online repository operated by ZDF. In November 2011, the second season (Ijon Tichy: Raumpilot II) was aired on ZDFneo. Both seasons are available on DVD, with the second season having English subtitles.

Plot
Ijon Tichy, a sort of Baron Munchausen in space, navigates the universe in his "three-bedroom rocket". His homemade female robot Analoge Halluzinelle, a hologramme, is his ubiquitous companion. The part is played by Nora Tschirner. Together they experience various adventures on alien planets, inside cosmic eddies, or within their own spacecraft. Tichy narrates the stories with an artificial Eastern European accent. The plot features many comic and satirically exaggerated situations that are often aimed at popular genres.

Production
The series is based on The Star Diaries and other works by Stanisław Lem that involve Ijon Tichy. From this material, Randa Chahoud, Dennis Jacobsen and Oliver Jahn, fellow students at the German Film and Television Academy Berlin (dffb), created two short films Aus den Sterntagebüchern des Ijon Tichy [From the Star Diaries of Ijon Tichy] (1999) and Aus den Sterntagebüchern des Ijon Tichy II (2000). The former won the audience award at the Hamburg International Short Film Festival in 1999. In 2005, Chahoud, Jacobsen and Jahn founded a production company, Kosmische Kollegen [Cosmic Colleagues]. Together with Karsten Aurich of Sabotage Films and dffb they were contracted by the ZDF network to realise the television series.

The set utilises numerous retro style items like household tools from the 1980s and 90s. Tichy's spacecraft is a giant French press that looks like an old Berlin apartment inside. Alien characters have been created with deliberately simple means. Many of the alien and robot characters utilized various forms of puppetry and animatronics. The first season was shot in Oliver Jahn's former apartment and since he moved house between the two seasons his original home was recreated in a studio for the filming of the second season.

List of episodes
The first season comprises six episodes of 15 minutes each that were aired from 26 March 2007 to 7 May 2007 on ZDF.

Season 1 (2007)

Season 2 (2011)
The second season consists of 8 double episodes of 24 minutes length each that were aired in double sequences between 4 and 25 November 2011 on ZDFneo.

Recognition

Asteroids 343000 Ijontichy and 343444 Halluzinelle are named in commemoration of the series.

References

External links
 
 

2007 German television series debuts
ZDF original programming
2011 German television series endings
German science fiction television series
German television shows featuring puppetry
Films based on works by Stanisław Lem
Space adventure television series
Television series based on short fiction
German-language television shows